Paul Mulla (1882–1959) (formerly Mollazade Mehmed Ali) was a Turkish Cretan Catholic prelate naturalized French and a professor of Islamic Studies at the Pontificio Istituto Orientale.

Biography

Mulla was born in Crete under the Ottoman Empire in a Turkish family. His father 
İbrahim Pertev was a military doctor and president of the Cretan Muslim community.
After having been a fervent Muslim in his youth, at the age of fourteen, Ali was sent by his father to study at the Mignonet high school in Aix-en-Provence. After graduating in 1899, he enrolled at the University of Aix-en-Provence in the faculty of law with the intention of becoming a lawyer. The Catholic philosopher Maurice Blondel taught in the faculty, who had a profound influence on the young Mulla. After following his courses for three years, Mulla expressed his desire to convert to Roman Catholic Christianity and after a short period of catechumenate he was baptised in January 1905, taking the Christian name Paul. Immediately afterwards he returned to his family where he stayed for a year, but a difficult period passed, because his conversion was not well accepted, principally by his father. Back in France, he decided to enter the seminary and was ordained a Catholic priest in 1911.

Presbytariate

He was ordained priest in 1913. Mulla intended to return to Turkey to exercise his ministry, but was dissuaded by Ahmed Riza, a Turkish politician living in exile in Paris. He then decided to stay in France and in 1913 obtained French citizenship, beginning to exercise the priestly ministry in Aix-en-Provence. At the outbreak of the First World War he was called into the army and sent to a military hospital, but due to his knowledge of oriental languages (Turkish, Greek, Arabic and Persian) he was sent to Beirut as an interpreter for the eastern staff. After the war he returned to France in 1919 and returned to being a priest in Aix-en-Provence, also dedicating himself to teaching. Maurice Blondel did not like the idea of one of his best students teaching him in the school of a small provincial diocese, so in 1924 he reported him to the president of the Pontifical Oriental Institute.

With the approval of Pope Pius XI, Paul Mulla was called to Rome in the academic year 1924-1925 to teach Islam and oriental languages. In 1927 Mulla was appointed monsignor and more later wrote a book on his spiritual journey. Mulla remained teaching at the Pontifical Oriental Institute until his death in 1959.

Mulla was a consultant to three popes (Pius XI, Pius XII and for a short period of John XXIII) in matters of Islamic religions. Although he published little due to sight problems, he had a profound impact on the Catholic Church for a better knowledge of the Islamic religion, preparatory to the opening of a religious dialogue.

Bibliography

 Vincenzo Poggi, Paul Ali Mehmet Mulla Zade: Islamologist of three popes, Pontifical Oriental Institute, 2012.

Sources

 For a dialogue between Christians and Muslims - Fr. Julius Basetti-Sani (1967)
 Quid - Religions - Catholicism - Histoire 
 A 1948 interview with Paul Mulla by Sedat Simavi

References

1882 births
1959 deaths
Converts to Roman Catholicism from Islam
Academic staff of the Pontifical Oriental Institute
20th-century French Roman Catholic priests
Turkish Roman Catholic priests
Turkish scholars of Islam
French scholars of Islam
Turkish former Muslims
Christian scholars of Islam